Lida Husik (born 1963) is an American Washington, D.C./ New York City-based musician, who was active mainly in the 1990s. She released three albums for New York–based label Shimmy Disc. She later signed a deal with Caroline Records/Astralwerks, releasing a psychedelic record for Astralwerks and a more folky record for Caroline Records. In her later years she moved to Los Angeles and signed to Alias Records, recording three records for them. Husik disappeared from the music scene until she self-released a new single to digital outlets in 2006.

History 
Lida Husik was born in 1963 in Washington, D.C. Starting in third grade, she learned violin and performed in her grade school band, Lafayette Elementary School orchestra. Eventually she taught herself how to play the drums and joined the punk band the Mourning Glories. During her brief time with the band, Husik learned about 4-track recording and decided to pursue a career as a solo artist. Eventually Don Fleming, frontman of the Velvet Monkeys, introduced her to producer Kramer. Through Shimmy Disc, Kramer's record label, Husik released her debut album Bozo. At this point she had taught herself how to play several instruments including the guitar, bass guitar, and piano. In 1994, she caught the attention of Beaumont Hannant, a British producer and DJ and collaborated with him on projects.

Discography

Albums 
 Bozo (CD) – Shimmy Disc (1991)
 Your Bag (CD) – Shimmy Disc (1992)
 The Return of Red Emma (CD) – Shimmy Disc (1992)
 Evening at the Grange (With Beaumont Hannant) (CD) – Astralwerks (1994)
 Joyride (CD) – Caroline Records (1995)
 Green Blue Fire (As Husikesque) (CD) – Astralwerks/Caroline Records (1996)
 Fly Stereophonic – (CD) Alias Records (1997)
 Faith in Space – (CD) Alias Records (1998)
 Mad Flavor – (CD) Alias Records (1999)
 Nuclear Soul  – (Digital Single) Husik Musik (2006)
 Motheroceanmorning – (Digital Album) Husik Musik (2018)

References

External links 

1963 births
Living people
American rock singers
Record producers from Washington, D.C.
Shimmy Disc artists